Bonsucesso is a neighborhood in the North Zone of Rio de Janeiro, Brazil with a population of about 18,000. The name, formerly also spelt Bomsucesso, may be translated with "good luck."

Formerly the neighbourhood was known for industry, which has since moved largely to the outskirts of Rio and made place for a more service based economy.

It may be best known for the Bonsucesso Futebol Clube, which dates back to  the year 1913.

Neighbourhoods in Rio de Janeiro (city)